
Gmina Chojnów is a rural gmina (administrative district) in Legnica County, Lower Silesian Voivodeship, in south-western Poland. Its seat is the town of Chojnów, although the town is not part of the territory of the gmina.

Neighbouring gminas
Gmina Chojnów is bordered by the town of Chojnów and the gminas of Chocianów, Gromadka, Lubin, Miłkowice, Warta Bolesławiecka, Zagrodno and Złotoryja.

Villages
The gmina contains the villages of Biała, Biskupin, Brzozy, Budziwojów, Czernikowice, Dębrzyno, Dobroszów, Dzwonów, Gołaczów, Goliszów, Gołocin, Groble, Jaroszówka, Jerzmanowice, Kobiałka, Kolonia Kołłątaja, Konradówka, Krzywa, Michów, Niedźwiedzice, Okmiany, Osetnica, Pątnów, Pawlikowice, Piotrowice, Rokitki, Stary Łom, Strupice, Witków, Witkówek and Zamienice.

References

Chojnow
Legnica County